The Polhem Prize (Polhemspriset) is a Swedish award for a high-level technological innovation or an ingenious solution to a technical problem. The innovation must be available and shown competitive on the open market.
The prize is awarded by Swedish Association of Graduate Engineers (Sveriges Ingenjörer) (formerly Civilingenjörsförbundet and Svenska Teknologföreningen)   The prize is named after  Swedish scientist, inventor and industrialist  Christopher Polhem (1661–1751).

Laureates

References

External links
Polhemspriset - about the prize, page language Swedish
Polhem prize winners through all times

Swedish science and technology awards